Philip Charles Shelley Sidney, 1st Baron De L'Isle and Dudley GCH (11 March 1800 – 4 March 1851) was a British Tory politician.

Early life
Sidney was the only son of Sir John Shelley-Sidney, 1st Baronet and Henrietta Hunloke. The poet Percy Bysshe Shelley was his cousin. He was educated at Eton and Christ Church, Oxford.

Marriage and issue
On 13 August 1825, he married Lady Sophia FitzClarence, illegitimate daughter of King William IV and his mistress, the actress Dorothea Jordan. Lord and Lady De L'Isle and Dudley had four children:
 The Hon. Adelaide Augusta Wilhelmina Sidney (d. 1904). Married The Hon. Frederick FitzClarence-Hunloke in 1856; no issue.
 The Hon. Ernestine Wellington Sidney (d. 1910). Married to Philip Perceval in 1868; had issue.
 The Hon. Sophia Philippa Sidney (d. 1907). Married to Count Alexander von Kielmansegg in 1871; no issue.
 Philip Sidney, 2nd Baron De L'Isle and Dudley (1828–1898). Married firstly to Mary Foulis in 1850; had issue. Married secondly to Emily Frances Ramsay in 1893; no issue.

Career
Sidney represented Eye in the House of Commons from 1829 to 1831 and also served as an equerry to his father-in-law from 1830 to 1835 and as Surveyor-General of the Duchy of Cornwall from 1833 to 1849. In 1835, fourteen years before he succeeded his father, he was raised to the peerage as Baron De L'Isle and Dudley, of Penshurst in the County of Kent.

Death
Lord de L'Isle and Dudley died in March 1851, aged 50, and was succeeded in his titles by his son Philip.

References

External links

 

De L'Isle and Dudley, Philip Sidney, 1st Baron
De L'Isle and Dudley, Philip Sidney, 1st Baron
Sidney, Philip
Sidney, Philip
Sidney, Philip
UK MPs who were granted peerages
Equerries
People educated at Eton College
Alumni of Christ Church, Oxford
Barons De L'Isle and Dudley
Peers of the United Kingdom created by William IV